ExpoCité (formerly Parc de l'Exposition) is a multi-site entertainment complex located in the borough of La Cité-Limoilou, in downtown Quebec City. This is also the name of the  corporation authorized by the City of Quebec to administer the site. ExpoCité was best known for Expo Québec an annual 12-day exhibition held in August but folded in 2016. The Salon de l'Auto de Québec (Quebec City Auto Show) is held there each March.

Facilities

 Videotron Centre, a large multipurpose arena
 Colisée Pepsi, a large multipurpose arena
 Pavillon de la Jeunesse, a multipurpose arena
 Centre de foires de Québec, an exhibition space
 Pavillon de l'industrie et du commerce
 Pavillon des Arts
 Karting Extrême, an indoor go-kart track

Grand Prix de Québec

From 1977 to 1979 the Parc de l'Exposition hosted the Grand Prix Labatt de Québec featuring rounds of the Formula Atlantic Labatt Championship Series.  The races featured future driving stars Gilles Villeneuve, Bobby Rahal, Keke Rosberg and Danny Sullivan.

The Grand Prix weekends also featured Formula Ford, Honda BF Goodrich Challenge Series and production sportscar races.

References

External links
 ExpoCité
 Expo Québec
 Salon de jeux de Québec
 Club Jockey du Québec (organizers of the Hippodrome de Québec)
 Karting Extrême

Tourist attractions in Quebec City
Motorsport in Canada
Defunct motorsport venues in Canada